Gallery 339 was a photographic art gallery located in Philadelphia, United States. The gallery promoted the work of established and emerging photographers.

Gallery 339 opened in May 2005 and presented several exhibitions featuring work from the USA, Japan, South Korea, and Great Britain. It was Philadelphia's only fine art photography gallery and closed in 2017.

References

External links
Official website

Art galleries established in 2005
Art museums and galleries in Philadelphia
Photography museums and galleries in the United States
2005 establishments in Pennsylvania